Fikkan Peak is a peak midway between Big Brother Bluff and Mount Burnham along the west wall of the Daniels Range, in the Usarp Mountains of Antarctica. It was mapped by the United States Geological Survey from surveys and U.S. Navy air photos, 1960–63, and was named by the Advisory Committee on Antarctic Names for Philip R. Fikkan, a United States Antarctic Research Program geologist at McMurdo Station, 1967–68.

References 

Mountains of Oates Land